Christian Fernando Noboa Tello (born 9 April 1985) is an Ecuadorian footballer who plays for Russian Premier League club PFC Sochi and the Ecuador national team as a central midfielder.

Club career

Emelec
Christian started out at Emelec.

Rubin Kazan

2007–2012
Christian was transferred in 2007 to FC Rubin Kazan of the Russian Premier League. In 2008, he helped Rubin win its first title of the RPL in history. In 2009, he played in the UEFA Champions League. On 29 September 2010, as a captain, Noboa helped Rubin Kazan obtain a draw against FC Barcelona in a Champions League match by scoring his side's only goal from a penalty kick.

Dynamo Moscow

2012
On 26 January 2012 Noboa signed with Dynamo Moscow for £8 million.
His first match for Dynamo was on 5 March, in a 0–1 home loss to Anzhi Makhachkala. He played in 10 league matches for Dynamo in the 2012 season.

2012–13
His first match of the season was on 21 July, in 0–1 away loss to Volga Nizhny Novgorod. His first goal for club and season was on 25 August, in a 3–2 away win against Lokomotiv Moscow, which he later celebrated with tears after not having scored for a while. His next goal came in a 1–2 home loss to Kuban Krasnodar. His third goal of the first half of the season came in a 5–1 away win against league leaders CSKA Moscow. On 5 April Noboa scored a free-kick goal, in a 1–1 away draw against FK Amkar Perm'. On 21 April, Noboa scored the first goal in a 3–3 away draw against Anzhi.

2013–14
On 3 August he scored the winning goal against Terek Grozny (1–0).

2014–15
It was confirmed on 29 December 2014 that Noboa would not renegotiate terms with his club and is open to offers. On 31 December, the official site of FC Dynamo Moscow issued statement thanking Noboa for his services and wishing him good luck.

P.A.O.K.
On 7 January 2015, it was confirmed that Noboa would be joining PAOK FC on a 2.5 year contract. In an interview given to a radio station in Ecuador, Noboa revealed that his buy-out clause at PAOK is in the region of €1.5 million.  Even though there is not any formal interest yet, Noboa hinted that he could be tempted to move away from PAOK if a Mexican club makes an approach.“I like the prospect of playing in Mexico. I hope that something concrete may come up. I would be open to play in a club there,” Noboa has reportedly said. On 8 January, he made his debut with the club in a 1–0 home win against Platanias, and scored his first goal on 21 February in a 3–1 away win against Veria.

He was in contention for the first two games in the Super League play-offs as he is set to travel to Ecuador late in May in order to start preparations for the Copa America. The Ecuadorian midfielder revealed that he will fly to his homeland on 27 May in order to be in contention with his National Team ahead of the tournament in Latin America which goes underway two weeks later.

Rostov
On 29 July 2015, Noboa signed a two-year contract with Russian Premier League side FC Rostov. He scored a goal on his Rostov debut in a 1–0 win over FC Amkar Perm on 28 August 2015.

Zenit
On 4 June 2017, Noboa signed a three-year deal with FC Zenit Saint Petersburg.

Return to Rubin Kazan
On 18 February 2018, Noboa returned to Rubin on loan from Zenit until the end of the 2017–18 season.

Sochi
On 5 August 2019, he signed a 2-year contract with Russian Premier League newcomers PFC Sochi, joining several other former Zenit players on the squad. As of 25 August 2020, Noboa scored nine goals for FC Sochi, including a late goal against FC Tambov on the matchday 5. On 19 January 2023, Noboa extended his contract with Sochi for the 2023–24 season, with an option for 2024–25 season.

International career

Noboa was called up to the Ecuador national team for a series of two unofficial friendly matches in late 2006 against Spanish provincial sides.

Under Sixto Vizuete's current management, he made his official debut against Brazil in a 2010 World Cup qualifiers. In the match, Noboa scored a wonderful goal to tie the game in the 89th minute for his first international goal. Noboa may have saved Ecuador's qualification dreams as he scored his second goal in as many games against Paraguay on 1 April 2009.  On 7 June 2009, in a World Cup qualification match he helped Ecuador beat Peru 2–1 in Lima.

Career statistics

Club

International

Scores and results list Ecuador's goal tally first, score column indicates score after each Ecuador goal.

Personal life 
Noboa was married to Russian Olga Romanova, with whom he had two sons, Christopher and Lucas.

Honours 

Rubin Kazan
 Russian Premier League: 2008, 2009
 Russian Super Cup: 2010

Zenit Saint Petersburg
 Russian Premier League: 2018–19

Individual
 Russian Premier League Top Assist Provider: 2020–21
 Russian Premier League best player (as chosen by the Russian Football Union): 2021–22

References

External links
Christian Noboa profile at Federación Ecuatoriana de Fútbol 
 Profile & Statistics at Guardian's Stats Centre

1985 births
Sportspeople from Guayaquil
Living people
Association football midfielders
Ecuadorian footballers
Ecuador international footballers
C.S. Emelec footballers
FC Rubin Kazan players
FC Dynamo Moscow players
PAOK FC players
FC Rostov players
FC Zenit Saint Petersburg players
PFC Sochi players
Ecuadorian expatriate footballers
Expatriate footballers in Russia
Ecuadorian expatriate sportspeople in Russia
Expatriate footballers in Greece
Ecuadorian expatriate sportspeople in Greece
Ecuadorian Serie A players
Russian Premier League players
Super League Greece players
2011 Copa América players
2014 FIFA World Cup players
2015 Copa América players
Copa América Centenario players
2021 Copa América players